The Ministry of Internal Trade and Consumer Protection is a department of the Council of Ministers of the Syrian Arab Republic.

History 
Founded in 2012.

Ministers 

 Talal Al-Barazi
Amr Salem

References 

Economy ministers
Consumer ministries
Trade ministries
2012 establishments in Syria
Government ministries of Syria
Ministries established in 2012
Organizations based in Damascus